The 2015 Texas Tech Red Raiders baseball team represented Texas Tech University during the 2015 NCAA Division I baseball season. The Red Raiders played their home games at Dan Law Field at Rip Griffin Park as a member of the Big 12 Conference. They were led by head coach Tim Tadlock in his 3rd season at Texas Tech.

Previous season
In 2014, the Red Raiders finished the season 4th in the Big 12 with a record of 45–21, 14–10 in conference play. They qualified for the 2014 Big 12 Conference baseball tournament, and were eliminated in the first round. They qualified for the 2014 NCAA Division I baseball tournament, and were placed in the Coral Gables regional, along with host Miami (FL), Columbia, and Bethune-Cookman. In their first game, the Red Raiders defeated Columbia, 3–2, and advanced to the next leg, where they defeated Miami (FL), 3–0. In the regional final, Texas Tech was again matched up with Miami, and dropped the first game by a score of 1–2 in 10 innings. In the second game, the Red Raiders rebounded to beat the Hurricanes 4–0 and advanced to the Super Regional. As hosts of the Super Regional, the Red Raiders defeated College of Charleston in two games, both by a score of 1–0, to advance to their first ever College World Series.

In the College World Series, Texas Tech was eliminated quickly, after only two games, losing first to conference opponent TCU, 2–3, then to Ole Miss, 1–2. They finished the season with a record of 45–21.

Personnel

Roster

Coaching staff

Season

February
Texas Tech opened its season with a four-game series against West Coast Conference foe . In the opening game of the series on February 13, the Red Raiders rebounded from an early 0–3 deficit, but scored six runs in the third inning, powering their way to a 9–7 Opening Day victory.

Schedule

! style=""|Regular Season: 30–22
|- valign="top" 

|-style="background:#cfc"
| February 13 || 2:00 PM ||  || #9 || Dan Law Field at Rip Griffin Park • Lubbock, TX || 9–7 || Patterson (1–0) || Shew (0–1) || — || 4,375 || 1–0 || — || 
|-style="background:#cfc"
| February 14 || 12:00 PM ||  || #9 || Dan Law Field at Rip Griffin Park • Lubbock, TX || 15–6 || Mushinski (1–0) || Rincon (0–1) || — || 4,200 || 2–0 || — || 
|-style="background:#cfc"
| February 14 || 4:00 PM ||  || #9 || Dan Law Field at Rip Griffin Park • Lubbock, TX || 13–5 || Dusek (1–0) || Lee (0–1) || — || 4,418 || 3–0 || — || 
|-style="background:#cfc"
| February 15 || 12:00 PM ||  || #9 || Dan Law Field at Rip Griffin Park • Lubbock, TX || 9–7 || Damron (1–0) || Cecilio (0–1) || Moreno (1) || 3,192 || 4–0 || — || 
|-style="background:#fbb"
| February 17 || 2:00 PM ||  || #7 || Dan Law Field at Rip Griffin Park • Lubbock, TX || 4–8 || Held (1–0) || Moreno (0–1) || — || 2,796 || 4–1 || — || 
|-style="background:#cfc"
| February 20 || 2:00 PM ||  || #7 || Dan Law Field at Rip Griffin Park • Lubbock, TX || 8–0 || Moseley (1–0) || Neumann (0–1) || — || 3,200 || 5–1 || — || 
|-style="background:#cfc"
| February 20 || 5:15 PM ||  || #7 || Dan Law Field at Rip Griffin Park • Lubbock, TX || 5–0 || Smith (1–0) || Fuller (1–1) || Moreno (2) || 3,572 || 6–1 || — || 
|-style="background:#cfc"
| February 21 || 12:00 PM ||  || #7 || Dan Law Field at Rip Griffin Park • Lubbock, TX || 6–4 || Dusek (2–0) || Ormsby (1–1) || Taylor (1) || 3,875 || 7–1 || — || 
|-style="background:#cfc"
| February 21 || 3:05 PM ||  || #7 || Dan Law Field at Rip Griffin Park • Lubbock, TX || 6–0 || Damron (2–0) || Ceja (0–1) || — || 4,086 || 8–1 || — || 
|-style="background:#cfc"
| February 25 || 7:00 PM ||  || #7 || Dan Law Field at Rip Griffin Park • Lubbock, TX || 4–3 || Moreno (1–1) || Dillon (2–2) || — || 2,921 || 9–1 || — || 
|-

|-style="background:#cfc"
| March 3 || 3:30 PM ||  || #6 || Dan Law Field at Rip Griffin Park • Lubbock, TX || 6–5 (16) || Tripp (1–0) || Gawrieh (0–2) || — || 2,756 || 10–1 || — || 
|-style="background:#fbb"
| March 6 || 9:00 PM || at #30 Cal State Fullerton || #6 || Goodwin Field • Fullerton || 0–4 || Eshelman (2–2) || Smith (1–1) || — || 1,777 || 10–2 || — || 
|-style="background:#fbb"
| March 7 || 9:00 PM || at #30 Cal State Fullerton || #6 || Goodwin Field • Fullerton || 2–3 || Garza (1–0) || Moseley (1–1) || Peitzmeier (5) || 2,640 || 10–3 || — || 
|-style="background:#fbb"
| March 8 || 3:00 PM || at #30 Cal State Fullerton || #6 || Goodwin Field • Fullerton || 5–6 || Gavin (2–0) || Dusek (2–1) || Peitzmeier (6) || 1,623 || 10–4 || — || 
|-style="background:#cfc"
| March 10 || 6:30 PM ||  || #15 || Dan Law Field at Rip Griffin Park • Lubbock, TX || 4–3 (12) || Mushinski (2–0) || Herendeen (0–1) || — || 3,587 || 11–4 || — || 
|-style="background:#cfc"
| March 11 || 2:00 PM ||  || #15 || Dan Law Field at Rip Griffin Park • Lubbock, TX || 7–4 || Brown (1–0) || Mansfiled (0–1) || Taylor (2) || 3,074 || 12–4 || — || 
|-style="background:#fbb"
| March 13 || 8:00 PM || at  || #15 || Tony Gwynn Stadium • San Diego, CA || 0–9 || Derby (2–1) || Moseley (1–2) || — || 568 || 12–5 || — || 
|-style="background:#cfc"
| March 14 || 4:00 PM || at  || #15 || Tony Gwynn Stadium • San Diego, CA || 11–0 || Smith (2–1) || Thompson (1–1) || — || 473 || 13–5 || — || 
|-style="background:#cfc"
| March 15 || 3:00 PM || at  || #15 || Tony Gwynn Stadium • San Diego, CA || 6–3 || Taylor (1–0) || Seyler (4–1) || Moreno (3) || 553 || 14–5 || — || 
|-style="background:#fbb"
| March 17 || 6:30 PM ||  || #13 || Dan Law Field at Rip Griffin Park • Lubbock, TX || 7–9 (11) || Holley (1–0) || Moreno (1–2) || McDavid (1) || 2,906 || 14–6 || — || 
|-style="background:#cfc"
| March 18 || 2:00 PM ||  || #13 || Dan Law Field at Rip Griffin Park • Lubbock, TX || 7–4 || Patterson (2–0) || Howe (0–1) || — || 3,327 || 15–6 || — || 
|-style="background:#cfc"
| March 20 || 6:00 PM || at Oklahoma || #13 || L. Dale Mitchell Baseball Park • Norman, OK || 6–1 || Moseley (2–2) || Elliott (3–2) || — || 1,227 || 16–6 || 1–0 || 
|-style="background:#fbb"
| March 21 || 2:02 PM || at Oklahoma || #13 || L. Dale Mitchell Baseball Park • Norman, OK || 2–5 || Hansen (3–2) || Smith (2–2) || — || 1,313 || 16–7 || 1–1 || 
|-style="background:#fbb" 
| March 22 || 1:00 PM || at Oklahoma || #13 || L. Dale Mitchell Baseball Park • Norman, OK || 2–3 || Tasin (4–1) || Moreno (1–3) || Evans (2) || 1,412 || 16–8 || 1–2 || 
|-style="background:#fbb"
| March 24 || 2:00 PM ||  || || Dan Law Field at Rip Griffin Park • Lubbock, TX || 6–7 || Presto (2–1) || Damron (2–1) || Schilling (1) || 3,091 || 16–9 || — || 
|-style="background:#fbb"
| March 27 || 6:30 PM || Kansas || || Dan Law Field at Rip Griffin Park • Lubbock, TX || 4–7 || Krauth (5–2) || Mushinski (2–1) || Villines (7) || 3,595 || 16–10 || 1–3 || 
|-style="background:#cfc"
| March 28 || 2:00 PM || Kansas || || Dan Law Field at Rip Griffin Park • Lubbock, TX || 9–3 || Smith (3–2) || Weiman (0–4) || — || 3,861 || 17–10 || 2–3 || 
|-style="background:#cfc"
| March 29 || 1:00 PM || Kansas || || Dan Law Field at Rip Griffin Park • Lubbock, TX || 3–2 || Taylor (2–0) || Villines (1–1) || Moreno (4) || 3,812 || 18–10 || 3–3 || 
|-style="background:#fbb"
| March 31 || 3:00 PM || at  || || Lobo Field • Albuquerque, NM || 5–6 || Estrella (1–1) || Brown (1–1) || Sanchez (2) || 1,106 || 18–11 || — || 
|-

|-style="background:#fbb"
| April 2 || 6:30 PM || #2 TCU || || Dan Law Field at Rip Griffin Park • Lubbock, TX || 0–8 || Traver (5–0) || Moseley (2–3) || — || 4,393 || 18–12 || 3–4 || 
|-style="background:#cfc"
| April 3 || 2:00 PM || #2 TCU || || Dan Law Field at Rip Griffin Park • Lubbock, TX || 5–1 || Smith (4–2) || Morrison (6–1) || — || 3,974 || 19–12 || 4–4 || 
|-style="background:#fbb"
| April 4 || 2:00 PM || #2 TCU || || Dan Law Field at Rip Griffin Park • Lubbock, TX || 1–4 || Young (6–1) || Damron (2–2) || Ferrell (8) || 4,432 || 19–13 || 4–5 || 
|-style="background:#fbb"
| April 7 || 2:00 PM || at  || || J. L. Johnson Stadium • Tulsa, OK || 4–5 || Hightower (1–0) || Custred (0–1) || Sequeira (4) || 551 || 19–14 || — || 
|-style="background:#cfc"
| April 10 || 6:30 PM || Baylor || || Dan Law Field at Rip Griffin Park • Lubbock, TX || 8–4 || Moseley (3–3) || Castano (2–4) || — || 3,974 || 20–14 || 5–5 || 
|-style="background:#cfc"
| April 11 || 2:00 PM || Baylor || || Dan Law Field at Rip Griffin Park • Lubbock, TX || 3–2 (12) || Moreno (2–3) || Montemayor (0–3) || — || 4,387 || 21–14 || 6–5 || 
|-style="background:#cfc"
| April 12 || 2:00 PM || Baylor || || Dan Law Field at Rip Griffin Park • Lubbock, TX || 9–5 || Damron (3–2) || Lewis (1–1) || — || 3,573 || 22–14 || 7–5 || 
|-style="background:#cfc"
| April 14 || 6:30 PM || at  || #27 || Crutcher Scott Field • Abilene, TX || 7–6 || Withrow (1–0) || Hanson (1–1) || Moreno (5) || 1,537 || 23–14 || — || 
|-style="background:#fbb"
| April 17 || 3:00 PM || at Kansas State || #27 || Tointon Family Stadium • Manhattan, KS || 3–5 || Erickson (1–2) || Moseley (3–4) || Fischer (1) || 2,631 || 23–15 || 7–6 || 
|-style="background:#cfc"
| April 18 || 2:00 PM || at Kansas State || #27 || Tointon Family Stadium • Manhattan, KS || 7–1 || Smith (5–2) || Courville (0–4) || — || 2,864 || 24–15 || 8–6 || 
|-style="background:#cfc"
| April 19 || 1:00 PM || at Kansas State || #27 || Tointon Family Stadium • Manhattan, KS || 4–1 || Taylor (3–0) || Griep (3–2) || Moreno (6) || 1,780 || 25–15 || 9–6 || 
|-style="background:#cfc"
| April 21 || 6:30 PM || vs.  || #24 || Security Bank Ballpark • Midland, TX || 10–2 || Custred (1–1) || Zotkya (2–2) || — || 3,512 || 26–15 || — || 
|-style="background:#cfc"
| April 24 || 6:30 PM || #9 Oklahoma State || #24 || Dan Law Field at Rip Griffin Park • Lubbock, TX || 5–3 || Moseley (4–4) || Perrin (4–4) || Moreno (7) || 4,025 || 27–15 || 10–6 || 
|-style="background:#fbb"
| April 25 || 2:00 PM || #9 Oklahoma State || #24 || Dan Law Field at Rip Griffin Park • Lubbock, TX || 2–8 || Freeman (7–2) || Smith (5–3) || — || 4,423 || 27–16 || 10–7 || 
|-style="background:#fbb"
| April 26 || 2:00 PM || #9 Oklahoma State || #24 || Dan Law Field at Rip Griffin Park • Lubbock, TX || 3–6 || LaRue (2–0) || Withrow (1–1) || Glover (5) || 4,171 || 27–17 || 10–8 || 
|-style="background:#fbb"
| April 28 || 6:30 PM ||  || #28 || Dan Law Field at Rip Griffin Park • Lubbock, TX || 4–5 (10) || Garcia-Pierre (1–0) || Custred (1–2) || — || 3,126 || 27–18 || — || 
|-style="background:#fbb"
| April 29 || 2:00 PM ||  || #28 || Dan Law Field at Rip Griffin Park • Lubbock, TX || 5–10 || Vorhof (4–0) || Tripp (1–1) || Brendel (2) || 3,113 || 27–19 || — || 
|-

|-style="background:#fbb"
| May 1 || 6:00 PM || at Texas || #28 || UFCU Disch–Falk Field • Austin, TX || 0–3 || French (3–3) || Moseley (4–3) || Mayes (2) || 5,261 || 27–20 || 10–9 || 
|-style="background:#cfc"
| May 2 || 2:00 PM || at Texas || #28 || UFCU Disch–Falk Field • Austin, TX || 9–1 || Smith (6–3) || Culbreth (3–4) || — || 7,018 || 28–20 || 11–9 || 
|-style="background:#cfc"
| May 3 || 1:00 PM || at Texas || #28 || UFCU Disch–Falk Field • Austin, TX || 5–1 || Moreno (3–3) || Mayes (1–4) || — || 6,284 || 29–20 || 12–9 || 
|-style="background:#fbb"
| May 14 || 5:00 PM || at West Virginia || || Monongalia County Ballpark • Granville, WV || 4–6 || Donato (7–5) || Moseley (4–6) || Dotson (1) || 1,384 || 29–21 || 12–10 || 
|-style="background:#fbb"
| May 15 || 5:00 PM || at West Virginia || || Monongalia County Ballpark • Granville, WV || 2–8 || Vance (7–4) || Smith (6–4) || — || 1,883 || 29–22 || 12–11 || 
|-style="background:#cfc"
| May 16 || 5:00 PM || at West Virginia || || Monongalia County Ballpark • Granville, WV || 8–2 || Damron (4–2) || Myers (2–5) || — || 1,697 || 30–22 || 13–11 || 
|-

|-
! style="" | Post–season: 1–2
|- 

|-style="background:#fbb"
| May 20 || 9:00 AM || vs. (5) Texas || (4) || ONEOK Field • Tulsa, OK || 1–2 || French (4–3) || Smith (6–5) || — || 2,801 || 30–23 || 0–1 || 
|-style="background:#cfc"
| May 21 || 9:00 AM || vs. #4 (1) TCU || (4) || ONEOK Field • Tulsa, OK || 8–1 || Taylor (4–0) || Morrison (11–2) || — || 2,960 || 31–23 || 1–1 || 
|-style="background:#fbb"
| May 22 || 3:15 PM || vs. (8) Baylor || (4) || ONEOK Field • Tulsa, OK || 4–5 || Lewis (4–2) || Dusek (2–2) || Spicer (8) || 3,645 || 31–24 || 1–2 || 
|-

|-
| style="font-size:88%" | Legend:       = Win       = Loss       = PostponementBold = Texas Tech team member
|-
| style="font-size:88%" | "#" represents ranking. All rankings from Collegiate Baseball on the date of the contest."()" represents postseason seeding in the Big 12 Tournament.

Rankings

Awards and honors
Eric Gutierrez
 Louisville Slugger Pre-season First Team All-American
 Perfect Game USA Pre-season Second Team All-American

References

Texas Tech Red Raiders
Texas Tech Red Raiders baseball seasons